This is a list of fossiliferous stratigraphic units in Republic of Kosovo.

References 
 

 Kosovo
Geology of Kosovo
Fossiliferous stratigraphic units